Yevhenii Dykhne (12 October 1963, Chernivtsi, Ukrainian SSR) is a Ukrainian airline executive. Since 2019 he has been the president and chief executive officer (CEO) of Ukraine International Airlines.

Education 

Yevhenii Dykhne having completed the second education of the “Organization of transportation and management on the daily transport” at the National Aviation University (Kyiv) and secured a diploma on the topic “Optimization of throughput capacity”. The first education of the “Carriage and Carriage Gentlement” was taken from the Institute of Engineers for Railway Transport (Dnipropetrovsk) in 1988.

Career 

Dykhne is Member of the Aviation Committee at Ukrainian Chamber of Commerce and Industry, member of the supervisory board of the National Aviation University.

Prior to his appointment as CEO of UIA on September 18, 2019, Yevhenii Dykhne was the Senior Manager of Boryspil International Airport State Enterprise.

In 2014–2017, he is acting Director General of Boryspil International Airport State Enterprise. Operated under his direction Boryspil International Airport achieved record profit which raised the amount of payments to the budget in two times, performed all loan obligations timelyand has reached profound understanding with the basic airline. From 2017 worked as the First DeputyDirector General of the airport. Before joining Boryspil International Airport he held managerial positions in PJSC Ukrzaliznytsia.

In 2013–2014, Yevhenii Dykhne used to be the Director of Passengers Cariage Service at Ukrzaliznytsia, actively reforming the enterprise, contributing to strategy development and management of passenger services.

In 2008–2009 he worked as deputy director of the State Enterprise Settlement Center of the Ministry of Transportation and Communication of Ukraine.

In 2007–2008, Dykhne worked at Lviv Airlines as Deputy General Director, and later as General Director.

Recognition 

In December 2019, he was recognized as one of the 100 most influential Ukrainians in the rating by Focus magazine. At the end of 2019, together with the top management team, UIA initiated the optimization of the airline's route network in order to reduce excess costs and bring the company to break-even in 2020 with further stable development.

Social activities 

From October 2016 to October 2019, he was the chairman of the Aviation Committee at the Ukrainian Chamber of Commerce and Industry.

In March 2017, as the chairman of the Aviation Committee, he was elected a member of the Public Council at the State Aviation Administration of Ukraine to represent the interests of members of the committee and the aviation industry from the Chamber of Commerce and Industry of Ukraine.

In December 2017, he joined the activities of the Air Transport Committee under the Expert Council at the Ministry of Infrastructure of Ukraine.

References

External links 

 Ukrainian airliner crashes in Iran, killing all 176 aboard, Toronto Star, 08.01.2020 (with update 12.01.2021)
Flight PS752 crash anniversary: investigation stalling, families mourning, Aerotime Hub, 08.01.2021
GEORGIA IS A STRATEGIC DESTINATION FOR UIA, BusinessMediaGeorgia, 21.04.2021
 UIA expects to restore long-haul hub services next year, FlightGlobal, 28.05.2020
 Ukraine International presents its business recovery strategy, Airline routes&ground services, 24.05.2020
 
Kyiv Boryspil International Airport sees revenue and passenger boost internationalairportreview. 17.08.2016
Optimistic UIA seeks to build on profitable performance FlightGlobal. 14.12.2021
Are the features of Ukrainian business and effective compliance compatible?, The Ukrainian Post. 20.12.2021
UKRAINE INTERNATIONAL AIRLINES WANTS TO RESTRUCTURE DEBTS TO BORYSPIL AIRPORT AND UKSATSE, Ukraine open for business, 11.01.2022
UKRAINE INTERNATIONAL AIRLINES PLANS TO RESTORE HUB MODEL IN 2022, Ukraine open for business, 11.01.2022
Mulling possibility of arbitration appeal to Iran for compensation - CEO of UIA, Interfax, 12.01.2022
UKRAINE INTERNATIONAL AIRLINES INCREASES PASSENGER TRAFFIC BY 1.7 TIMES IN 2021, Ukraine open for business, 12.01.2022
Public opinion exaggerates UIA's relations with Kolomoisky - CEO of airline, Interfax. 14.01.2022
CEO OF UKRAINE INTERNATIONAL AIRLINES: PUBLIC OPINION EXAGGERATES UIA’S RELATIONS WITH KOLOMOISKY, Ukraine open for business. 14.01.2022

Chief executives in the airline industry
Businesspeople from Chernivtsi
1963 births
Living people